The 2021 eNASCAR iRacing Pro Invitational Series was the second and final season of the eNASCAR iRacing Pro Invitational Series, a series of iRacing sim racing events originally organized for NASCAR drivers to compete in after its 2020 seasons were put on hold due to the COVID-19 pandemic.

After the success of the series, NASCAR decided to bring it back on a more permanent basis in 2021, although this time, the races, 10 in total, would be held on Wednesday nights at least once a month. Additionally, Fox, which broadcast all of the races in the series in 2020, would be joined by NBC, the other channel that broadcasts real-life NASCAR races, this season, with each channel airing five races apiece. Fox and NBC would choose the racetracks that their races would be on. The series began on March 24 with a race at the virtual version of dirt Bristol Motor Speedway,

The Saturday Night Thunder series of races for drivers in NASCAR's lower series did not return in 2021. However, before each race, at least 10 drivers from NASCAR's lower series were selected to be on a ballot for a fan vote for one starting spot in each eNASCAR iRacing Pro Invitational Series race.

Teams and drivers

Chartered teams

Complete schedule

Limited schedule

Non-chartered teams

Complete schedule

Limited schedule

Notes

Schedule
On January 26, 2021, Fox announced the dates of their five races, and four of the five tracks that they would be on. On March 24, NASCAR, iRacing, and Fox announced that the fifth race of Fox's schedule of races for the series would take place at an imaginary street course in the Chicago Loop in Downtown Chicago.

Races

Bristol Dirt Race
Just like in the actual NASCAR Cup Series, all 36 chartered teams were given spots in the field, with four seats will be available to other teams. The drivers to take those four spots were chosen at the discretion of NASCAR on Fox. However, they only filled two of those four spots, which were for Dale Earnhardt Jr. driving a No. 88 car for his team, JR Motorsports, and their color commentator, the retired driver Clint Bowyer, driving a No. 79 car owned by himself, which was a Ford, the most recent manufacturer he had when he raced in the Cup Series. Also, the No. 4 Stewart-Haas Racing team of Kevin Harvick (who declined to participate in this race) was replaced by the open team of the No. 37 for JTG Daugherty Racing driven by Ryan Preece, a client of Harvick's sports management agency. After outrage online that the MBM Motorsports No. 66 driven by Timmy Hill, an open team in real-life Cup Series competition, was not invited to participate, Austin Cindric, who was to drive the No. 2 for Team Penske in place of Brad Keselowski (who also declined to participate), decided to give up his seat to Hill. The popular underdog driver won the race at Texas in Season One. Fans were able to make the hashtag "#LetTimmyRace" trending on Twitter the day before and of the race in support of Hill to be in the race.

Top ten finishers:

Talladega
After deciding not to participate in the Bristol Dirt iRacing event, Brad Keselowski and Kevin Harvick returned for this race. Because Kurt Busch, Chase Briscoe and Christopher Bell were at Nashville Superspeedway that day for a test, it was announced when the entry list was posted that Busch and Briscoe would not be participating and that Bell would participate if he could make it home in time, but if not, he would be replaced in his No. 20 by Ty Gibbs. On the day of the race, it was announced that Briscoe would be entering the race after all since the tire test finished earlier than anticipated. However, Kurt Busch still did not enter.

Any chartered team in real-life Cup Series competition who entered the race was given a spot in the field (35 of 36 did- the only one that did not enter was Kurt Busch's No. 1 car). To fill the remaining spots in the 40 car field, Fox gave provisionals to Dale Earnhardt Jr. and Clint Bowyer again, a third one to Keelan Harvick, the 8-year-old son of Kevin Harvick, who competed in a No. 62 car (his car number in go-kart racing). After fans were frustrated that Timmy Hill's No. 66 car for MBM Motorsports was not given a starting spot in the field for the Bristol dirt race, it was given a spot for this race. The final spot in the field was determined by a fan vote of drivers in the lower series of NASCAR who are experienced iRacers. Part-time Xfinity and Truck Series driver Jesse Iwuji won the fan vote. Iwuji, who is also a United States Navy Reserve officer, competed in the race from Dahlgren Hall at the United States Naval Academy in Annapolis, Maryland. The other drivers on the ballot in the fan vote were Justin Allgaier, Josh Berry, Landon Cassill, Rajah Caruth, Noah Gragson, Austin Hill, Nick Sanchez, Ryan Truex, and Ryan Vargas.

James Davison started on the pole and led 61 of 70 laps, but he was passed by Brad Keselowski on the last lap, who went on to win the race, and then completed the sweep by winning the real race at Talladega that weekend.

This was the first race in both years of the series without Ryan Preece (since Harvick participated in this race and that Preece's team does not have a charter in 2021), as well as the first in which William Byron did not lead any laps.

Top ten finishers:

Darlington
The fan vote returned for the race at Darlington, with all ten drivers (including Iwuji) from the first fan vote back on the ballot and the additions of Derek Kraus, Alex Labbé, and Ryan Preece. Iwuji would win the fan vote again, which put him in the field for the second straight race. However, since Daniel Suárez went back to using the No. 99, his usual number, Iwuji used the No. 87 (B. J. McLeod Motorsports' No. 78 backward). Bobby Labonte participated in this race instead of Clint Bowyer, and with Labonte also being a Fox commentator, he raced in the simulator in the Fox studio instead of Bowyer. 35 of 36 chartered teams entered, with the only one skipping the race being Ryan Blaney and his Penske No. 12 car, due to him being at Texas Motor Speedway for a tire test on the same day.

On the heels of the announcement of NASCAR's Next Gen car earlier in the day of this race, iRacing and NASCAR debuted the virtual version of the car in this race.

Dale Earnhardt Jr. started on the pole and led the opening laps before being passed by William Byron, who led the most laps. After Byron was involved in a late-race crash, Erik Jones passed Timmy Hill with two laps to go and held on to score the victory.

Top ten finishers:

Circuit of the Americas
For the fourth round of the iRacing Pro Invitational Series, Iwuji won his second straight fan vote. Bowyer returned to the Fox booth simulator run this race after being replaced by Labonte in the previous race at Darlington. On the heels of making his Cup Series debut in the real race at COTA, road course ringer Kyle Tilley replaced B. J. McLeod in the No. 78 for Live Fast Motorsports; the same was the case in the real-life race. Kaz Grala was added to the list of drivers on the ballot in the fan vote, joining the same 13 drivers that were on it previously. All 36 chartered teams were entered. Unlike each of the previous races, none skipped this race.

Davison scored his second pole of the season and led all 32 laps to win the race, while Alfredo finished second for the second race in a row.

Top ten finishers:

Chicago Street Course
James Davison won his second straight race in the series, and did it with a 56 second lead over the second-place car (his Rick Ware Racing teammate Josh Bilicki in the No. 52). It was Davison's 3rd pole of the season and the second consecutive race in which he led every lap. Davison also became the second driver in series history to win back-to-back races, joining William Byron as the only drivers to do so.

Timmy Hill drove a Ford in this race instead of a Toyota. Jesse Iwuji won the fan vote for the fourth time, remaining the only driver to have won the fan vote in the races that it has been offered.

Fox only gave out one promoter's provisional for this race (for Dale Earnhardt Jr.), as Clint Bowyer did not participate in this race. However, unlike at Darlington, Bowyer did still appear on the broadcast, replacing Jeff Gordon as a color commentator. Gordon was not on the broadcast for this race. William Byron drove on Bowyer's simulator in the Fox studio instead of at home in this race.

As this race ended up being the finale of the Invitational Series, it meant that James Davison would finish the championship in 1st place.

Top ten finishers:

See also
 2021 NASCAR Cup Series
 2021 NASCAR Xfinity Series
 2021 NASCAR Camping World Truck Series
 2021 ARCA Menards Series
 2021 ARCA Menards Series East
 2021 ARCA Menards Series West
 2021 NASCAR Whelen Modified Tour
 2021 NASCAR Pinty's Series
 2021 NASCAR PEAK Mexico Series
 2021 NASCAR Whelen Euro Series
 2021 SRX Series

References

External links

 eNASCAR Official website

eNASCAR iRacing